United Nations Security Council Resolution 267, adopted unanimously on July 3, 1969, after reaffirming resolution 252, calls on Israel to rescind measures of annexation of East Jerusalem. The Council also concluded that in the event of a negative or no response from Israel, it would reconvene to discuss further action.

See also
 Israeli–Palestinian conflict
 List of United Nations Security Council Resolutions 201 to 300 (1965–1971)

References
Text of the Resolution at undocs.org

External links
 

 0267
 0267
20th century in Jerusalem
July 1969 events